The Little Partridge River is a river in northern Cochrane District in Northeastern Ontario, Canada. It is in the James Bay drainage basin and is a right tributary of the Partridge River, which it enters just upstream of the latter's mouth at James Bay.

Tributaries
Waginagan Creek (left)
Muskeg Creek (left)
Atik Creek (left)

See also
List of rivers of Ontario

References

Sources

Rivers of Cochrane District